Russell Irving Tamblyn, also known as Rusty Tamblyn (born December 30, 1934) is an American film and television actor and dancer.

Born and raised in Los Angeles, Tamblyn trained as a gymnast in his youth. He began his career as a child actor for Metro-Goldwyn-Mayer. Tamblyn appeared in the musical Seven Brides for Seven Brothers (1954). He subsequently portrayed Norman Page in the drama Peyton Place (1957), for which he earned an Academy Award nomination for Best Supporting Actor. In West Side Story (1961), he portrayed Riff, the leader of the Jets gang.

Throughout the 1970s, Tamblyn appeared in several exploitation films and worked as a choreographer in the 1980s. In 1990, he starred as Dr. Lawrence Jacoby in David Lynch's television drama Twin Peaks, reprising the role during its 2017 revival.

Early life
Tamblyn was born December 30, 1934, in Los Angeles, California, to actors Sally Aileen (Triplett) and Edward Francis "Eddie" Tamblyn. His younger brother, Larry Tamblyn, was the organist for the 1960s band the Standells. Tamblyn was a hyperactive child with a penchant for gymnastics and performing. He took the stage during intermissions at the local movie theater and gave tumbling performances. When he was 13, Tamblyn lived in North Hollywood, studied dramatics under Grace Bowman and dancing at the North Hollywood Academy, owned and operated by his parents.

Career

1948–1952: Child acting
Tamblyn wanted to be a circus performer and was skilled in acrobatics and dancing as a child. He developed a musical act that involved singing, dancing, juggling and comedy.

Discovered at age 10 by actor Lloyd Bridges after acting in a play, Tamblyn first appeared on film in a small non-speaking role in The Boy With Green Hair (1948), after which he appeared on The Ed Sullivan Show. At age 13 he appeared in the stage play The Stone Jungle.

Tamblyn was given a role in The Kid from Cleveland (1949), billed third (as "Rusty Tamblyn") under stars George Brent and Lynn Bari. The movie was not a success, but it established Tamblyn as a film actor. He appeared as young Saul in Reign of Terror, Cecil B. DeMille's 1949 version of Samson and Delilah, and in What Happened to Jo Jo? (1950).

Tamblyn played the younger Bart Tare (played as an adult by John Dall) in the film noir Gun Crazy (1950) and Elizabeth Taylor's younger brother in Father of the Bride (also 1950) and its sequel, Father's Little Dividend (1951). He appeared in Captain Carey, U.S.A. (1950), The Gangster We Made (1950), As Young as You Feel (1951), Cave of Outlaws (1951), Retreat, Hell! (1952), and The Winning Team (1952).

1953–1962: MGM and leading roles

MGM was impressed by Tamblyn's performance in Retreat, Hell! and signed him to a long-term contract. His first role under the contract was as a young soldier in boot camp in Take the High Ground! (1953), directed by Richard Brooks. His training as a gymnast in high school, and abilities as an acrobat, prepared him for his breakout role as Gideon, the youngest brother, in Seven Brides for Seven Brothers (1954).

Tamblyn was not a trained dancer and always considered himself an actor who danced rather than the other way around, but the film was a big success and established him at MGM. Tamblyn was one of many studio contract players in the musical Deep in My Heart (1954). He played Eleanor Parker's brother in the Western Many Rivers to Cross (1955), and was one of several young MGM actors (others included Jane Powell and Debbie Reynolds) in the musical Hit the Deck (1955).

Tamblyn supported older actors in two Westerns: Robert Taylor (American actor) and Stewart Granger in The Last Hunt (1956), a flop; and Glenn Ford and Broderick Crawford in The Fastest Gun Alive (1956), a big hit, where he performed an extraordinary "shovel" dance at a hoe-down early in the film. He served (uncredited) as a choreographer for Elvis Presley in 1957's Jailhouse Rock. MGM loaned Tamblyn to Allied Artists for his first star role, The Young Guns (1957). Back at MGM he supported Glenn Ford and Gia Scala in Don't Go Near the Water (1957), a comedy set among members of the U.S. Navy.

Tamblyn portrayed Norman Page in the film of Peyton Place (1957) at 20th Century Fox, opposite Lana Turner and Diane Varsi. For his performance he received an Academy Award nomination for Best Supporting Actor. He was then given a star role at MGM, playing Tony Baker in High School Confidential (1958). The film was a solid hit. Also successful was the musical Tom Thumb (1958) made for George Pal, in which Tamblyn was cast in the title role. His career momentum was interrupted when he was drafted into the United States Army in 1958.

Upon his return MGM gave him a prominent support part in Cimarron (1960), supporting Glenn Ford. Tamblyn's best-known musical role came as Riff, the leader of the Jets street gang in West Side Story (1961). He then appeared in two MGM Cinerama movies, The Wonderful World of the Brothers Grimm and How the West Was Won (both 1962). He played Luke Sanderson in The Haunting and Lt. "Smitty" Smith in MGM's Follow the Boys (both 1963).

1963–1976: Television and independent films
Tamblyn was unable to consolidate his position as a leading man, and later said he "dropped out" after his West Side Story success and devoted himself to art, refusing movie roles, as well as a role in the TV series Gilligan's Island. In the 1960s he appeared in the TV series The Greatest Show on Earth ("Silent Love, Secret Love"; 1963), and Channing ("The Last Testament of Buddy Crown"; 1963).

Tamblyn played a Viking alongside Richard Widmark and Sidney Poitier in The Long Ships (1965). Also in 1965 he appeared in Burke's Law ("Who Killed Rosie Sunset?"); and in Days of Our Lives.

Tamblyn had the starring role in the low-budget MGM Western Son of a Gunfighter (1965) and starred in the 1966 Japanese kaiju film War of the Gargantuas.  He guest starred on Tarzan ("Leopard on the Loose"; 1966), and Iron Horse ("Decision at Sundown"; 1967). Tamblyn later said he became "bored" with acting around this time and more interested in art.

Tamblyn starred in the notorious biker movie Satan's Sadists (1969) for Al Adamson. He followed it with Scream Free! (1969), The Last Movie (1971), The Female Bunch (1971) and Dracula vs. Frankenstein (1971) for Adamson.

He appeared on TV in Cade's County ("Ragged Edge"; 1972), Win, Place or Steal (1973), The World Through the Eyes of Children (1975), The Quest ("The Captive"; 1976), The Life and Times of Grizzly Adams ("The Skyrider"; 1978), and Nero Wolfe ("Before I Die"; 1981). He was also in Black Heat (1976).

At the same time he worked in exploitation, Tamblyn also worked in the construction industry and computer software.

1978–1989: Choreography and film
Tamblyn played the supporting role in Neil Young's 1982 Human Highway while also credited for screenplay and choreography. Tamblyn is credited as director, choreographer and actor for Young's Greendale concert tour. He choreographed a play, Man with Bags, in 1983.

Tamblyn appeared in Fame, Commando Squad (1987) for Fred Olen Ray, The Phantom Empire (1988), Necromancer (1988), B.O.R.N. (1988), The Bloody Monks (1988), and an episode of Quantum Leap. He was in Aftershock (1990) and Wizards of the Demon Sword (1991) for Fred Olen Ray.

1990–2004: Twin Peaks and other work

In 1990–91, Tamblyn starred as Dr. Lawrence Jacoby on the David Lynch-created series Twin Peaks (alongside his West Side Story co-star Richard Beymer, who played Ben Horne); his scenes in the 1992 prequel film Twin Peaks: Fire Walk with Me were cut.

He appeared in Running Mates (1992), Little Devils: The Birth (1993), Cabin Boy (1994), Desert Steel (1995), and Babylon 5. He appeared on stage in Los Angeles in Zastrozzi. His work drifted back to straight to video: Starstruck (1995), Rebellious (1995), Attack of the 60 Foot Centerfold (1995) and Invisible Mom (1996) for Fred Olen Ray, Johnny Mysto: Boy Wizard (1997), My Ghost Dog (1997), and Little Miss Magic (1998) for Ray.

Tamblyn appeared on another soap opera, General Hospital, alongside his daughter Amber in 1997 and 2000. In 2004, he appeared with Amber again, playing God in the form of a man walking dogs, in three episodes of Joan of Arcadia. The two also worked together in the films Rebellious, Johnny Mysto: Boy Wizard, and The Increasingly Poor Decisions of Todd Margaret. In Quentin Tarantino's film Django Unchained, they were billed respectively as "Son of a Gunfighter" and "Daughter of a Son of a Gunfighter", alluding to his leading role in the 1965 western Son of a Gunfighter.

In 2004, the Academy Film Archive preserved the mid-1960s works First Film and Rio Reel by Tamblyn.

2005–present: Later roles

Tamblyn had supporting roles in Drive (2011), Django Unchained (2012), and Hits (2014). He appeared several times in The Increasingly Poor Decisions of Todd Margaret, and in the revival of Twin Peaks (2017).

Personal life
Tamblyn married actress Venetia Stevenson in 1956, but they divorced the next year. In 1960 he married Elizabeth Kempton, a showgirl, in Las Vegas. In later years, Tamblyn discovered he had a daughter he did not previously know about from the 1960's with artist and spiritual practitioner Elizabeth Anne Vigil. His first daughter, China Faye Tamblyn, is an artist and heavy metal welder who lives in California. Tamblyn did not meet her until she was a teenager, and only after the birth of his second child, actress Amber Tamblyn, who was born in 1983 to his third wife, Bonnie Murray.

In 2012, it was announced that Tamblyn was working on an autobiography, Dancing On The Edge.

Tamblyn underwent open heart surgery in October 2014. There were complications afterward and during his rehabilitation, but his health had reportedly improved by February 2015.

In June 2021, Amber Tamblyn wrote an essay in The New York Times expressing solidarity with Britney Spears's effort to end the conservatorship controlling her life. Tamblyn wrote that she became financially successful when she turned 21 and starred in Joan of Arcadia. Her father became her co-manager and her mother her business manager. She wrote that having her parents on the payroll complicated their relationship, and that having money at such a young age also complicated other relationships with relatives, friends and romantic partners, that she was "everybody's ATM", and that her money "paid for our vacations, dinners out, and sometimes even the bills". But she wrote that she remains close to her parents despite those difficult years. "My mom taught me everything I know about money management, from balancing checkbooks to coding my business expenses in my credit card statements. My father was a fiercely protective advocate."

Filmography

Film

Television

Awards and nominations

References

Works cited

External links
 
 

1934 births
Living people
20th-century American male actors
21st-century American male actors
American male dancers
American male film actors
American male stage actors
American male television actors
Male Western (genre) film actors
Male actors from Greater Los Angeles
New Star of the Year (Actor) Golden Globe winners
MGM Records artists
Metro-Goldwyn-Mayer contract players
People from Topanga, California